Al-Qarṭuiyah (القرطوعية) is a town in the Amman Governorate of north-western Jordan.

It is located several miles north-east of Amman.

References

Populated places in Amman Governorate